Operation Danny (Mivtza Dani) was an Israeli military offensive launched at the end of the first truce of the 1948 Arab–Israeli War. The objectives were to capture territory east of Tel Aviv and then to push inland and relieve the Jewish population and forces in Jerusalem. The main forces fighting against the IDF were the Arab Legion and Palestinian irregulars

It took place on July 9–19, 1948, being launched at the end of the first truce. On 10 July, Glubb Pasha ordered the defending Arab Legion troops to "make arrangements...for a phony war".

The operation commander was Yigal Allon and his deputy was Yitzhak Rabin. The total force numbered around 6,000 soldiers.

Name
The operation was named after Palmach officer Daniel "Dani" Mass, who had fallen on January 16, 1948, while commanding a relief action known as "Convoy of 35".

Objectives
The first phase of Operation Dani was to capture the cities of Lydda and Ramle, located on the road to Jerusalem, southeast of Tel Aviv. Ramle was one of the main obstacles blocking Jewish transportation. From the start of the war, Lydda and Ramle militiamen had attacked Jewish traffic on nearby roads. Ramle became a focal point for blocking Jewish transportation, forcing traffic from Jerusalem to Tel Aviv to a southern bypass.

The second phase was to capture the fort at Latrun and break through Ramallah. The operation was carried out under Palmach command using the Yiftach Brigade, the Harel Brigade, the 8th Armored Brigade and two battalions from the Kiryati and Alexandroni brigades.

Lydda and Ramle

On 9 July units from the Yiftach Brigade began approaching Ramle from the south. At the same time troops from the other brigades began attacking villages north of Lydda. Caught in a pincer movement and with only a token Arab Legion presence the two towns were captured the following day. This put Lydda airport and the strategic railway station at Ramle in Israeli hands. Two days after the capture of Lydda and Ramle only a few hundred of the 50,000 to 70,000 residents remained in the two towns.

Latrun

The second phase of the operation failed after several costly attacks on Arab Legion positions at Latrun and the threat of a UN-imposed cease-fire.

Casualties
The Palmach record the names of ninety-one of its members killed during this Operation. Forty-four were killed at Khirbet Kurikur on 18 July 1948. Seven were killed in the capture of Lydda.

Palestinian Arab communities captured

Units
 Overall Commander: Yigal Allon
 8th Armored Brigade Commander Yitzhak Sadeh
 Alexandroni Brigade
 Kiryati Brigade (two battalions)
 Yiftach Brigade Commander Mula Cohen

See also
 Operation Ha-Har
 List of battles and operations in the 1948 Palestine war
 Depopulated Palestinian locations in Israel

References

External links

Dani
July 1948 events in Asia